Phạm Minh Giang (born 1981) is a former futsal player and currently the head coach of Vietnam futsal team and Thái Sơn Nam club. Phạm Minh Giang is the first domestic coach to lead the Vietnamese team to participate in a FIFA Futsal World Cup.

Playing career

When he was still a player, Phạm Minh Giang played for Thái Sơn Nam club.

Coaching career
After retiring, Phạm Minh Giang continued to work in Thái Sơn Nam and had time to take the position of head coach in this team. In December 2019, he was appointed as the interim coach of Vietnam futsal team. From January 2020 to present, he is the official coach. Phạm Minh Giang's first task was to lead the team in the Asian Cup 2020, but due to the COVID-19 pandemic, this tournament was canceled.

After that, he and his team overcame Lebanon futsal team to win tickets for the second time to the final round of World Cup 2021.
In this tournament, after losing to the championship candidate Brazil in the opening match, Vietnam defeated Panama with a score of 3-2 and draw the Czech Republic 1–1 to win tickets to the knockout round. In the knockout round, Vietnam lost close to the RFU (Russia) 2-3 and was eliminated in the round of 16. Phạm Minh Giang could not lead the team because he was positive for COVID-19.

References

1981 births
Living people
Vietnamese men's futsal players